Ivan Kirillovich Bocharov (born 18 May 1995) is a Russian professional ice hockey goaltender currently playing for Lokomotiv Yaroslavl of the Kontinental Hockey League (KHL).

Bocharov made his debut in the KHL during the 2017–18 season, with HC Dynamo Moscow. On 8 May 2020, Bocharov was signed to a two-year contract extension with Dynamo Moscow.

Following his fifth season with Dynamo, Bocharov left as a free agent and signed a two-year contract with Lokomotiv Yaroslavl on 1 May 2022.

Career statistics

Regular season and playoffs

International

References

External links
 

1995 births
Living people
Dynamo Balashikha players
HC Dynamo Moscow players
Ice hockey people from Moscow
HC MVD players
Russian ice hockey goaltenders
Sokol Krasnoyarsk players